Shahbal is an unmanned aerial vehicle (UAV) designed by a group of aerospace engineers at Sharif University of Technology.

Design and development
Shahbal was designed by the team of three newly graduated aerospace engineers of Sharif University of Technology, namely Alireza, Amirreza Kosari and Mohammad Rahim.

Originating from a national competition, Shahbal was first designed to fulfill the contest requirements. Right at the beginning stages, the development team expanded their goals.
Shahbal was awarded the Best Design Prize during the first National UAV Design Competition (NUDC-2006) of Iran and was awarded as a top-ranked vehicle after passing all the flight tests planned for the contest.

Technical design

Shahbal is a close-range multi-role UAV and is well-designed for surveillance/reconnaissance missions, along with patrols and pilot trainings. The structure is mainly composites and with a small radar cross section (RCS), Shahbal is able to complete its missions very close to the enemy radars.
The twin tail configuration empowers Shahbal of high sharp and fast maneuvers in both civil and military applications. Control is both in manual (radio control) and autopilot (GPS/INS) mode. The autopilot used is a MP2000 of MicroPilot; also Shahbal is designed to fulfill nap-of-the-earth maneuvers such as terrain following and terrain avoidance.
The landing gear mechanism is a fix tricycle plus an arresting hook. Powerplant is a 4.5 hp ZDZ engine installed as pusher, at the end of main body.
Mission payloads are depending on the type of mission, and range from small cameras and telemetry systems to heavy munitions and weapons. Maximum payload weight is 5.5 kg (12 lb).

Specifications

See also

External links
Official National UAV Design Competition website
National UAV Design Competition website on Sharif University Technology

Unmanned aerial vehicles of Iran
Aircraft manufactured in Iran
Single-engined pusher aircraft
Twin-boom aircraft